Blackland Records is an independent record label that was incorporated in 2005 by John Kent and Tim Wheeler.

Corporate history

Following John Kent's stint playing drums for Ben Kweller and Radish, businessman Tim Wheeler joined forces with the ex-rocker to form Blackland Records in 2005. After their incorporation, Blackland signed Brooklyn-based band Hymns, releasing their second album "Travel In Herds".

References

American record labels